The Canada Life Building in Montreal, Quebec, Canada is a Renaissance Revival building completed in 1895 by Buffalo, New York architect Richard A. Waite and is an example of a first-generation skyscraper.

Located in the heart of what was once Canada's financial capital on St. James Street, in what is now Old Montreal, the Canada Life Building was the first in Montreal to utilize an eight-storey steel structure.

References

Rémillard, François, Old Montreal — A Walking Tour, Ministère des Affaires culturelles du Québec,  1992

Office buildings in Montreal
Commercial buildings completed in 1895
Heritage buildings of Quebec
Old Montreal
Renaissance Revival architecture in Canada
1895 establishments in Quebec